Dušan Jovanović was a 13-year-old ethnic Romani boy from Belgrade, FR Yugoslavia, who was murdered on 18 October 1997 by two 17-year-old skinheads. He was beaten to death on the Beogradska street in downtown Belgrade while going from his family home to a nearby grocery store. The only reason for the murder was Jovanović's Romani origin.

Event
Dušan Jovanović was a 13-year-old boy who was living with his family in the Beogradska street near the Slavija Square in Belgrade. In the evening on 18 October 1997, his father Aleksandar gave the boy some money and sent him to a nearby grocery store to buy Coca-Cola. On the way to the store, Dušan was attacked by two members of the far-right skinhead movement. Upon recognizing his Romani origin, they ordered him to give them the money before throwing him to the ground, kicking him with metal-toed boots and striking him with a broken piece of rain gutter. Jovanović died from a broken neck. The only reason for the assault was Jovanović's apparent Romani origin. 

Aleksandar Jovanović began looking for his son. He eventually found Dušan's body covered in blood, lying on a flight of stairs.

Arrest and trial
Police quickly identified the two murderers as 17-year-olds Milan Čujić and Ištvan Fendrik from Zemun. In March 1998, the Belgrade District Court sentenced the two to the then-maximum sentence for minors: 10 years in the juvenile prison. They were sent to serve their sentences in the Juvenile Prison in Valjevo. Their sentences were later commuted by the court. Fendrik  was released from the prison on 1 April and Čujić on 30 April 2004.

While in prison, Fendrik was interviewed for the NIN weekly. He claimed that he was not a member of any political party, nor a neo-nazi or a member of the hooligans supporting FK Rad (as was speculated by the media). However, he admitted that he was influenced by far-right politics at the time of the murder. Fendrik showed remorse during the interview, and also after he was released. Čujić has stated publicly that he feels no remorse.

Aftermath
Dušan was buried two days after the murder, and hundreds of people attended his funeral. Soon after the tragedy, Jovanović's family moved to another house in the Mirijevo district of Belgrade. His mother committed suicide by hanging in July 2015 after other failed attempts. A sister, Kristina, born about three years after Dušan's murder, said that their mother "could never accept that her son was gone," and had expressed a desire to be with him for his birthday (August 1).  Aleksandar Jovanović father also suffered several heart attacks and two strokes, and died in late 2016.

On the tenth anniversary of the murder, 18 October 2007, then Serbian president Boris Tadić dedicated a memorial plaque for Jovanović in the Beogradska street on the house number 33, in front of which the boy was murdered.

See also
 Hate crime
 Child murder

References

1997 in Serbia
1997 murders in Serbia
October 1997 events in Europe
Murdered Serbian children
Deaths by beating in Europe
1997 deaths
Hate crimes in Europe
Antiziganism in Serbia
Incidents of violence against boys
People murdered in Serbia
Violence against men in Europe
Male murder victims